Camagüey is the main railway station of the city of Camagüey, seat of the homonym province, Cuba. The station, informally known as Camagüey Central, is owned by the state company Ferrocarriles de Cuba (FFCC) and is located in the Avenida Van Horne, in the middle of the city and just in front of the Hotel Plaza.

It is one of the most important stations of Cuba and, along with Havana Central, Santiago and Santa Clara, is a network's divisional headquarter.

History

The station was projected in 1830s and opened on 5 April 1846. It was the southern terminus of the line to the town of Nuevitas, on the Atlantic Coast.

Structure
Camagüey station has a large one-floor building in Spanish Colonial style. It counts 3 tracks, and the third serves a minor shed, extended along the nearby Finlay Park. It is crossed by the Avenida Carlos J. Finlay and, after a level crossing, counts a secondary passenger building. 2 km in south east, in the Garrido ward, it counts a larger shed with a motive power depot.

All the lines running through the station, including the main one (Havana–Santiago), are single-track lines and electrified.

Services
The station is served by several long-distance trains linking almost the whole island as the flagship Tren Francés (French Train) Havana–Santa Clara–Santiago. Other long-distance trains, principally departing/ending at Havana Central, link Camagüey to Holguín, Guantánamo, Bayamo, Matanzas, Ciego de Ávila, Las Tunas, Manzanillo and other cities. There are also some inter-regional and regional trains to Morón, Nuevitas, Vertientes and Santa Cruz del Sur.

See also

Havana Central railway station
Santiago de Cuba railway station
Santa Clara railway station

References

External links

Railway Station
Railway stations in Cuba
Railway stations opened in 1846
1846 establishments in the Spanish Empire
Railway stations in Cuba opened in 1846